Chengkau is a mukim in Rembau District, Negeri Sembilan, Malaysia.

In its early years, Chengkau town was built near the old railway station (the station building still exists) but later was moved near the access road (the Seremban to Tampin road). In the 1980s, half of the town was burned down, and this was later rebuilt with more modern structures.

In 2010, the decision was taken to build a new flyover to cater for the rapid growth of Chengkau. Chengkau also connecting with Pulau Mampat and Astana Raja.

References

Mukims of Negeri Sembilan
Rembau District